Carey Scurry (born December 4, 1962) is an American professional basketball player. A  forward from Long Island University, Scurry played three seasons (1985–1988) in the National Basketball Association (NBA)as a member of the Utah Jazz and New York Knicks. He averaged 4.7 points and 2.9 rebounds per game over the course of his NBA career. Scurry also played in Greece, Spain & Brazil.

In January 2006, Scurry was named to the Northeast Conference 25th Anniversary Men's Basketball Team.

Carey is the older brother of Moses Scurry, who played on the 1990 UNLV team that won the NCAA championship.

Brazilian coach Helio Rubens Garcia ranked Scurry as the third-most talented player whom he ever coached.

Notes

External links 
nba.com/historical/playerfile
basketpedya.com

1962 births
Living people
American expatriate basketball people in Argentina
American expatriate basketball people in Brazil
American expatriate basketball people in Belgium
American expatriate basketball people in Chile
American expatriate basketball people in France
American expatriate basketball people in Greece
American expatriate basketball people in the Philippines
American expatriate basketball people in Spain
American men's basketball players
Basketball players from New York City
Ferro Carril Oeste basketball players
Flamengo basketball players
G.E.P.U. basketball players
Liga ACB players
LIU Brooklyn Blackbirds men's basketball players
Magnolia Hotshots players
Northeastern Oklahoma A&M Golden Norsemen basketball players
New York Knicks players
Olympiacos B.C. players
Philippine Basketball Association imports
Rapid City Thrillers players
Small forwards
Sportspeople from Brooklyn
Utah Jazz draft picks
Utah Jazz players